Into the Net is a 1924 American film serial directed by George B. Seitz.

Cast
 Edna Murphy as Natalie Van Cleef
 Jack Mulhall as Bob Clayton
 Constance Bennett as Madge Clayton
 Bradley Barker as Bert Moore
 Frank Lackteen as Dr. Vining
 Frances Landau as Mrs. Fawcette
 Harry Semels as Ivan Invanovitch
 Tom Goodwin as Inspector Cabot
 Paul Porter as The Emperor
 Tom Blake

See also
 List of film serials
 List of film serials by studio

References

External links

Into the Net at SilentEra

1924 films
American silent serial films
American black-and-white films
Pathé Exchange film serials
Films directed by George B. Seitz
1920s American films